Y8 may refer to: 

 Shaanxi Y-8, a Chinese transport aircraft
  KJ-200, also known as by the NATO reporting name "Moth" or "Y-8 Balance Beam" is a Chinese Airborne early warning and control aircraft.
 LNER Class Y8, a class of British steam locomotives
 Yangtze River Express, a Chinese airline classified so by IATA  airline designator
 Youth 8 summit, more commonly known as the Y8 summit, the youth counterpart to the G8 summit

See also 
 8Y (disambiguation)